The War of the League of Cognac (1526–30) was fought between the Habsburg dominions of Charles V—primarily the Holy Roman Empire and Spain—and the League of Cognac, an alliance including the Kingdom of France, Pope Clement VII, the Republic of Venice, the Kingdom of England, the Duchy of Milan, and the Republic of Florence.

Prelude 

Shocked by the defeat of the Kingdom of France in the Italian War of 1521, Pope Clement VII, together with the Republic of Venice, began to organize an alliance to drive Charles V from the Italian Peninsula. Francis I, having signed the Treaty of Madrid, was released from his captivity in Madrid and returned to France, where he quickly announced his intention to assist Clement. Thus, on 22 May 1526, the League of Cognac was signed by Francis, Clement, Venice, Florence, and the Sforza of Milan, who desired to throw off the Imperial hegemony over them. Henry VIII of England, thwarted in his requests to have the treaty signed in England, refused to join.

Initial moves 

The League quickly seized Lodi, but Imperial troops marched into Lombardy and soon forced Sforza to abandon Milan. The Colonna, meanwhile, organized an attack on Rome, defeating the Papal forces and briefly seizing control of the city in September 1526; they were soon paid off and departed, however.

Rome 

Charles V now gathered a force of 14,000 German landsknechts and 6,000 Spanish tercios led by Georg Frundsberg and Charles of Bourbon; the forces combined at Piacenza and advanced on Rome. Francesco Guicciardini, now in command of the Papal armies, proved unable to resist them; and when the Duke of Bourbon was killed, the underpaid armies sacked the city, forcing the Pope to take refuge at Castel Sant'Angelo. His escape was made possible by the Swiss Guards' last stand.

Naples 

The looting of Rome, and the consequent removal of Clement from any real role in the war, prompted frantic action on the part of the French. On 30 April 1527, Henry VIII and Francis signed the Treaty of Westminster, pledging to combine their forces against Charles. Francis, having finally drawn Henry VIII into the League, sent an army under Odet de Foix and Pedro Navarro, Count of Oliveto through Genoa—where Andrea Doria had quickly joined the French and seized much of the Genoese fleet—to Naples, where it proceeded to dig itself in for an extended siege.

Genoa 

Doria, however, soon deserted the French for Charles. The siege collapsed as plague broke out in the French camp, killing most of the army along with Foix and Navarro. Andrea Doria's offensive in Genoa (where he soon broke the blockade of the city and forced the surrender of the French at Savona), together with the decisive defeat of a French relief force under Francis de Bourbon, Comte de St. Pol at the Battle of Landriano, ended Francis's hopes of regaining his hold on Italy.

Barcelona, Cambrai, and Bologna 

Following the defeat of his armies, Francis sought peace with Charles. The negotiations began in July 1529 in the border city of Cambrai; they were conducted primarily between Francis's mother Louise of Savoy for the French and her sister-in-law Margaret of Austria for her nephew the Emperor (leading to its being known as the Paix des Dames, Peace of the Ladies), Charles himself having sailed from Barcelona to Italy shortly before. The final terms largely mirrored those of the Treaty of Madrid three years earlier; Francis surrendered his rights to Artois, Flanders, and Tournai, and was obliged to pay a ransom of two million golden écus before his sons were to be released. Removed, however, were both the humiliating surrender of Burgundy itself and the various points dealing with Charles de Bourbon, who, having been killed two years prior, was no longer a candidate for leading an independent Kingdom of Provence. The final Treaty of Cambrai, signed on 3 August, removed France from the war, leaving Venice, Florence, and the Pope alone against Charles.

Charles, having arrived in Genoa, proceeded to Bologna to meet with the Pope. Clement absolved the participants of the sack of Rome and promised to crown Charles. In return, he received Ravenna and Cervia; cities which the Republic of Venice was forced to surrender—along with her remaining possessions in Apulia—to Charles in exchange for being permitted to retain the holdings she had won at Marignano. Finally, Francesco was permitted to return to Milan—Charles having abandoned his earlier plan to place Alessandro de' Medici on the throne, in part due to Venetian objections—for the sum of 900,000 scudi.

Florence 

The Republic of Florence alone continued to resist the Imperial forces, which were led by the Prince of Orange. A Florentine army under Francesco Ferruccio engaged the armies of the Emperor at the Battle of Gavinana in 1530, and, although the Prince of Orange himself was killed, the Imperial army won a decisive victory and the Republic of Florence surrendered ten days later. Alessandro de' Medici was then installed as Duke of Florence.

Notes

References 

 Arfaioli, Maurizio. The Black Bands of Giovanni: Infantry and Diplomacy During the Italian Wars (1526–1528). Pisa: Pisa University Press, Edizioni Plus, 2005. .
 Baumgartner, Frederic J. Louis XII. New York: St. Martin's Press, 1994. .
 Black, Jeremy. "Dynasty Forged by Fire." MHQ: The Quarterly Journal of Military History 18, no. 3 (Spring 2006): 34–43. .
 Blockmans, Wim. Emperor Charles V, 1500–1558. Translated by Isola van den Hoven-Vardon. New York: Oxford University Press, 2002. .
 Guicciardini, Francesco. The History of Italy. Translated by Sydney Alexander. Princeton: Princeton University Press, 1984. .
 Hackett, Francis. Francis the First. Garden City, New York: Doubleday, Doran & Co., 1937.
 Hall, Bert. Weapons and Warfare in Renaissance Europe: Gunpowder, Technology, and Tactics. Baltimore: Johns Hopkins University Press, 1997. .
 Hibbert, Christopher. Florence: The Biography of a City. New York: W. W. Norton & Company, 1993. .
 Konstam, Angus. Pavia 1525: The Climax of the Italian Wars. Oxford: Osprey Publishing, 1996. .
 Norwich, John Julius. A History of Venice. New York: Vintage Books, 1989. .
 Oman, Charles. A History of the Art of War in the Sixteenth Century. London: Methuen & Co., 1937.
 Phillips, Charles and Alan Axelrod. Encyclopedia of Wars. 3 vols. New York: Facts on File, 2005. .

1527 in law
1529 in law
16th-century conflicts
League of Cognac
League of Cognac
League of Cognac
League of Cognac
League of Cognac
League of Cognac
Wars involving the Republic of Genoa
League of Cognac
League of Cognac
League of Cognac
1520s in France
1530 in France
1520s in Italy
1530 in Italy
16th century in the Papal States
1520s in the Holy Roman Empire
1530 in the Holy Roman Empire
16th century in the Republic of Florence
16th century in the Republic of Venice